Alexandra Munteanu (born 31 January 1980) is a Romanian alpine skier. She competed in four events at the 2002 Winter Olympics.

References

1980 births
Living people
Romanian female alpine skiers
Olympic alpine skiers of Romania
Alpine skiers at the 2002 Winter Olympics
Sportspeople from Brașov